Tel Habuwa (also Tell Habua) is an archaeological site in Lower Egypt, located 3 kilometers from the Suez Canal in the Ismailia Governorate. It was suggested by scholars that this is the Ancient Egyptian Eastern-border city called Tjaru from the Middle Kingdom of Egypt.

The site consists of three sectors, labelled Tel Habuwa I, II and III. Tel Habuwa I dates from the end of the Second Intermediate Period, up to the 26th Dynasty. Tel Habuwa II dates to the beginning of the New Kingdom and also up to the 26th Dynasty. Tel Habuwa III seems to be mainly New Kingdom settlement remains.

The 2013 excavations in the site had unearthed the remains of buildings from Thutmoses III and Seti I's reigns and beneath them what seems to be a two stories tall administration buildings and silos from the Hyksos period. These buildings associated with the Hyksos were heavily burnt. The silos in Tel Habuwa could store up to 280 tons of grains, which led the scholars to believe that an army unit was sitting in this settlement. Underneath the courtyard in one of the administrative buildings, there were coffins and skeletons found, the skeletons contained clear evidences of violent deaths: they had cutting marks on them and signs of arrows' spearheads that penetrated their bodies and injured them. The bodies were estimated to be the remains of the Hyksos forces who battled against Ahmose I, whose papyrus describing the burning of the city was also found in Tel Habuwa.

Two steles were also discovered in Tel Habuwa, they contained the names of a woman who seemingly was a Hyksos royalty, called "Tani" (dated to live circa 1570 BC), whose title was "Sister of the King", and of a Hyksos prince called "Nahsy", who is also mentioned in the Turin King List and in scarabs previously found in Egypt.

The head of the excavation had offered that this site was attacked prior to Avaris' downfall to make sure that the Hyksos would not send messengers from Tel Habuwa to call back-up forces from Canaan (which is quite near) to aid them against Ahmose I's army.

In Tel Habuwa I were uncovered parts of a Saite temple complex. The main temple had pylons and was about 61.2 m long and 28.2 m wide. North east of the palace were excavated the remains of a palace and south of it were found the remains of a square building consisting of many casemates, forming a platform. Such buildings are known from others temple complexes. Their function is enigmatic.

See also
 List of ancient Egyptian sites

References

Hyksos cities in ancient Egypt
Archaeological sites in Egypt
Ismailia Governorate